A Diamond Hidden in the Mouth of a Corpse is a 1985 no wave compilation released on the Giorno Poetry Systems label.

Track listing

References

1985 compilation albums
Experimental rock compilation albums
Giorno Poetry Systems albums
Albums with cover art by Gary Panter